Recchia acutipennis is a species of beetle in the family Cerambycidae. It was described by Gahan in 1889.

References

Recchia (beetle)
Beetles described in 1889